Luffness Platform (also known as Luffness Golf Club Halt) served a golf course near Gullane in Scotland. It was served by the Aberlady, Gullane and North Berwick railway. This line diverged from the North British Railway Main Line at Aberlady Junction, east of the current Longniddry station. For the private use of members of the Luffness Golf Club, this unstaffed halt was opened in 1898 and closed in 1932. Passengers alighting had to inform the train guard at Gullane or Aberlady and passengers joining the train there had to request it to stop by hand signals.

History
Opened by the Aberlady, Gullane and North Berwick Railway, it was absorbed by the North British Railway. Then station passed on to the London and North Eastern Railway during the Grouping of 1923.

References

Notes

Sources 
 
 
 
 East Lothian Museums on Aberlady, Gullane and North Berwick Railway
Hajducki, A. The North Berwick and Gullane Branch Lines, Oakwood Press, 1992

Disused railway stations in East Lothian
Former North British Railway stations
Railway stations in Great Britain opened in 1898
Railway stations in Great Britain closed in 1932
1898 establishments in Scotland
1932 disestablishments in Scotland